Draddy Gymnasium is a 2,345-seat multi-purpose arena in the Bronx, New York. It is located on the campus of Manhattan College and is the home of the Manhattan Jaspers athletic teams including men's and women's basketball and women's volleyball.  The building has the largest indoor track in New York City.  It was named in the honor of alumnus Vincent dePaul Draddy.

The Draddy Gymnasium was featured in Season 1 of The Cosby Show where Clifford Huxtable trains to get ready for a relay race rematch of former college acquaintances at the Meadowlands Arena.

See also
 List of NCAA Division I basketball arenas

References

 

College basketball venues in the United States
Manhattan Jaspers basketball
Sports venues in the Bronx
Athletics (track and field) venues in New York City
Sports venues completed in 1978
1978 establishments in New York City
Basketball venues in New York City
Indoor track and field venues in New York (state)
College volleyball venues in the United States
Volleyball venues in New York City